Zeit is the German word meaning time or era.

Zeit may refer to:

Publications
 Die Zeit, German national weekly newspaper of record
 Zeit Wissen, bi-monthly popular science magazine published by Die Zeit
 Theater der Zeit, German monthly magazine on theatre and politics
 Zeit im Bild, the national television news program of Austria

Businesses and organizations
 ZEIT-Stiftung, charitable foundation named after Die Zeit
 Vercel, formerly known as Zeit.

Film and television
 Zeit der Störche, a 1971 East German film
 Zeit der Wünsche, a 2005 German television film
 Zeit genug, a 1982 German television series
 Zeit zu leben, a 1969 East German film

Other works
 Die Zeit, die Zeit, 2012 novel by Martin Suter
 Zeit (Rammstein album), 2022
 "Zeit" (Rammstein song), its title song
 Zeit (Tangerine Dream album), 1972, or its title song
 Zeit², a 2011 computer game by Ubisoft
 "Zeit", a song performed by Bianca Shomburg representing Germany in the Eurovision Song Contest 1997